Immaculate Conception Catholic Church is a historic Catholic church located in Rochester, New York. The larger complex consists of five buildings: the church (1864), former rectory (1871), the former parochial school (1926), the current rectory (ca. 1900), and garage (ca. 1926).

The church is known as an African-American Catholic parish and the complex was listed on the National Register of Historic Places in 2002.

Notable past students 
Mary E. Clarke, director of the Women's Army Corps

References

External links

Churches on the National Register of Historic Places in New York (state)
Roman Catholic Diocese of Rochester
Second Empire architecture in New York (state)
Italianate architecture in New York (state)
Roman Catholic churches in Rochester, New York
National Register of Historic Places in Rochester, New York
Italianate church buildings in the United States

African-American Roman Catholic churches